Jorge Rodríguez Navarro (died 2010/2011) was a Mexican footballer. He competed in the men's tournament at the 1948 Summer Olympics.

References

External links
 
 

Year of birth missing
2010s deaths
Year of death missing
Mexican footballers
Mexico international footballers
Olympic footballers of Mexico
Footballers at the 1948 Summer Olympics
Place of birth missing
Association football defenders
Atlas F.C. footballers